Dendropoma is a genus of irregularly coiled sea snails known as "worm shells" or "worm snails". These are marine gastropod molluscs in the family Vermetidae, the worm snails.

Species
According to the World Register of Marine Species (WoRMS), the following species with valid names are included within the genus Dendropoma :
 Dendropoma andamanicum (Prashad & Rao, 1933)
 Dendropoma anguliferum (Monterosato, 1884)
 Dendropoma corallinaceum (Tomlin, 1939)
 Dendropoma corrodens (d’Orbigny, 1842) - ringed wormsnail
 Dendropoma exsertum (Dall, 1881)
 Dendropoma ghanaense Keen & Morton, 1960
 Dendropoma gregarium Hadfield & Kay, 1972
 Dendropoma irregulare (d’Orbigny, 1842) - irregular wormsnail
 Dendropoma lituella (Mörch, 1861) - flat wormsnail  
 Dendropoma marchadi Keen & Morton, 1960
 Dendropoma maximum Sowerby, 1825
 Dendropoma mejillonensis Pacheco & Laudien, 2008
 Dendropoma meroclista Hadfield & Kay, 1972
 Dendropoma nebulosum (Dillwyn, 1817)
 Dendropoma petraeum (Monterosato, 1884)
 Dendropoma planatum (Suter, 1913) 
 Dendropoma psarocephala Hadfield & Kay, 1972
 Dendropoma rastrum (Mörch, 1861) - California wormsnail 
 Dendropoma rhyssoconcha Hadfield & Kay, 1972
 Dendropoma squamiferum Ponder, 1967 
 Dendropoma tholia Keen & Morton, 1960
Species brought into synonymy
 Dendropoma annulatus auct.: synonym of Dendropoma corrodens (d’Orbigny, 1841)
 Dendropoma cristatum (Biondi, 1857): synonym of Dendropoma petraeum (Monterosato, 1884)
 Dendropoma gregaria [sic] : synonym of Dendropoma gregarium Hadfield & Kay, 1972
 Dendropoma mejillonensis [sic]: synonym of Dendropoma mejillonense Pacheco & Laudien, 2008

References

 Dautzenberg, P. (1923). Liste préliminaire des mollusques marins de Madagascar et description de deux especes nouvelles. Journal de Conchyliologie 68: 21-74
 Vaught, K.C. (1989). A classification of the living Mollusca. American Malacologists: Melbourne, FL (USA). . XII, 195 pp
 Calvo M., Templado J. & Penchaszadeh P.E. (1998). Reproductive biology of the gregarious Mediterranean vermetid gastropod Dendropoma petraeum. Journal of the Marine Biological Association of the United Kingdom 78: 525-549
  Gofas, S.; Le Renard, J.; Bouchet, P. (2001). Mollusca, in: Costello, M.J. et al. (Ed.) (2001). European register of marine species: a check-list of the marine species in Europe and a bibliography of guides to their identification. Collection Patrimoines Naturels, 50: pp. 180–213
 Spencer, H.; Marshall. B. (2009). All Mollusca except Opisthobranchia. In: Gordon, D. (Ed.) (2009). New Zealand Inventory of Biodiversity. Volume One: Kingdom Animalia. 584 pp

External links
 
 Powell A. W. B., New Zealand Mollusca, William Collins Publishers Ltd, Auckland, New Zealand 1979 

Vermetidae